Bavayia goroensis is a species of geckos endemic to southeastern Grande Terre in New Caledonia.

References

Bavayia
Reptiles described in 2008
Taxa named by Aaron M. Bauer
Taxa named by Todd R. Jackman
Taxa named by Ross Allen Sadlier
Taxa named by Glenn Michael Shea
Taxa named by Anthony Whitaker
Geckos of New Caledonia